

Events

Pre-1600
 653 – Pope Martin I is arrested and taken to Constantinople, due to his opposition to monothelitism.
1242 – Following the Disputation of Paris, twenty-four carriage loads of Jewish religious manuscripts were burnt in Paris.
1397 – The Kalmar Union is formed under the rule of Margaret I of Denmark.
1462 – Vlad III the Impaler attempts to assassinate Mehmed II (The Night Attack at Târgovişte), forcing him to retreat from Wallachia.
1497 – Battle of Deptford Bridge: Forces under King Henry VII defeat troops led by Michael An Gof.
1565 – Matsunaga Hisahide assassinates the 13th Ashikaga shōgun, Ashikaga Yoshiteru.
1579 – Sir Francis Drake claims a land he calls Nova Albion (modern California) for England.
1596 – The Dutch explorer Willem Barentsz discovers the Arctic archipelago of Spitsbergen.

1601–1900
1631 – Mumtaz Mahal dies during childbirth. Her husband, Mughal emperor Shah Jahan I, will spend the next 17 years building her mausoleum, the Taj Mahal.
1665 – Battle of Montes Claros: Portugal definitively secured independence from Spain in the last battle of the Portuguese Restoration War.
1673 – French explorers Jacques Marquette and Louis Jolliet reach the Mississippi River and become the first Europeans to make a detailed account of its course.
1767 – Samuel Wallis, a British sea captain, sights Tahiti and is considered the first European to reach the island.
1773 – Cúcuta, Colombia, is founded by Juana Rangel de Cuéllar.
1775 – American Revolutionary War: Colonists inflict heavy casualties on British forces while losing the Battle of Bunker Hill.
1789 – In France, the Third Estate declares itself the National Assembly.
1794 – Foundation of Anglo-Corsican Kingdom.
1795 – The burghers of Swellendam expel the Dutch East India Company magistrate and declare a republic.
1839 – In the Kingdom of Hawaii, Kamehameha III issues the edict of toleration which gives Roman Catholics the freedom to worship in the Hawaiian Islands. The Hawaii Catholic Church and the Cathedral of Our Lady of Peace are established as a result.
1843 – The Wairau Affray, the first serious clash of arms between Māori and British settlers in the New Zealand Wars, takes place.
1861 – American Civil War: Battle of Vienna, Virginia.
1863 – American Civil War: Battle of Aldie in the Gettysburg Campaign.
1876 – American Indian Wars: Battle of the Rosebud: One thousand five hundred Sioux and Cheyenne led by Crazy Horse beat back General George Crook's forces at Rosebud Creek in Montana Territory.
1877 – American Indian Wars: Battle of White Bird Canyon: The Nez Perce defeat the U.S. Cavalry at White Bird Canyon in the Idaho Territory.
1885 – The Statue of Liberty arrives in New York Harbor.
1898 – The United States Navy Hospital Corps is established.
1900 – Boxer Rebellion: Western Allied and Japanese forces capture the Taku Forts in Tianjin, China.

1901–present
1901 – The College Board introduces its first standardized test, the forerunner to the SAT.
1910 – Aurel Vlaicu pilots an A. Vlaicu nr. 1 on its first flight.
1922 – Portuguese naval aviators Gago Coutinho and Sacadura Cabral complete the first aerial crossing of the South Atlantic.
1929 – The town of Murchison, New Zealand Is rocked by a 7.8 magnitude earthquake killing 17. At the time it was New Zealand's worst natural disaster.
1930 – U.S. President Herbert Hoover signs the Smoot–Hawley Tariff Act into law.
1932 – Bonus Army: Around a thousand World War I veterans amass at the United States Capitol as the U.S. Senate considers a bill that would give them certain benefits.
1933 – Union Station massacre: In Kansas City, Missouri, four FBI agents and captured fugitive Frank Nash are gunned down by gangsters attempting to free Nash.
1939 – Last public guillotining in France: Eugen Weidmann, a convicted murderer, is executed in Versailles outside the Saint-Pierre prison.
1940 – World War II:  is attacked and sunk by the Luftwaffe near Saint-Nazaire, France. At least 3,000 are killed in Britain's worst maritime disaster.
  1940   – World War II: The British Army's 11th Hussars assault and take Fort Capuzzo in Libya, Africa from Italian forces.
  1940   – The three Baltic states of Estonia, Latvia and Lithuania fall under the occupation of the Soviet Union.
1944 – Iceland declares independence from Denmark and becomes a republic.
1948 – United Airlines Flight 624, a Douglas DC-6, crashes near Mount Carmel, Pennsylvania, killing all 43 people on board.
1952 – Guatemala passes Decree 900, ordering the redistribution of uncultivated land.
1953 – Cold War: East Germany Workers Uprising: In East Germany, the Soviet Union orders a division of troops into East Berlin to quell a rebellion.
1958 – The Ironworkers Memorial Second Narrows Crossing, in the process of being built to connect Vancouver and North Vancouver (Canada), collapses into the Burrard Inlet killing 18 ironworkers and injuring others.
1963 – The United States Supreme Court rules 8–1 in Abington School District v. Schempp against requiring the reciting of Bible verses and the Lord's Prayer in public schools.
  1963   – A day after South Vietnamese President Ngô Đình Diệm announced the Joint Communiqué to end the Buddhist crisis, a riot involving around 2,000 people breaks out. One person is killed.
1967 – Nuclear weapons testing: China announces a successful test of its first thermonuclear weapon.
1971 – U.S. President Richard Nixon in a televised press conference called drug abuse "America's public enemy number one", starting the War on drugs.
1972 – Watergate scandal: Five White House operatives are arrested for burgling the offices of the Democratic National Committee during an attempt by members of the administration of President Richard M. Nixon to illegally wiretap the political opposition as part of a broader campaign to subvert the democratic process.
1985 – Space Shuttle program: STS-51-G mission: Space Shuttle Discovery launches carrying Sultan bin Salman bin Abdulaziz Al Saud, the first Arab and first Muslim in space, as a payload specialist.
1987 – With the death of the last individual of the species, the dusky seaside sparrow becomes extinct.
1989 – Interflug Flight 102 crashes during a rejected takeoff from Berlin Schönefeld Airport, killing 21 people.
1991 – Apartheid: The South African Parliament repeals the Population Registration Act which required racial classification of all South Africans at birth.
1992 – A "joint understanding" agreement on arms reduction is signed by U.S. President George Bush and Russian President Boris Yeltsin (this would be later codified in START II).
1994 – Following a televised low-speed highway chase, O. J. Simpson is arrested for the murders of his ex-wife, Nicole Brown Simpson, and her friend Ronald Goldman.
2015 – Nine people are killed in a mass shooting at Emanuel African Methodist Episcopal Church in Charleston, South Carolina.
2017 – A series of wildfires in central Portugal kill at least 64 people and injure 204 others.
2021 – Juneteenth National Independence Day, was signed into law by President Joe Biden, to become the first federal holiday established since Martin Luther King Jr. Day in 1983.

Births

Pre-1600
 801 – Drogo of Metz, Frankish bishop (d. 855)
1239 – Edward I, English king (d. 1307)
1530 – François de Montmorency, French nobleman (d. 1579)
1571 – Thomas Mun, English writer on economics (d. 1641)

1601–1900
1603 – Joseph of Cupertino, Italian mystic and saint (d. 1663)
1604 – John Maurice, Dutch nobleman (d. 1679)
1610 – Birgitte Thott, Danish scholar, writer and translator  (b. 1662)
1631 – Gauharara Begum, Mughal princess (d. 1706)
1682 – Charles XII, Swedish king (d. 1718)
1691 – Giovanni Paolo Panini, Italian painter and architect (d. 1765)
1693 – Johann Georg Walch, German theologian and author (d. 1775)
1704 – John Kay, English engineer, invented the Flying shuttle (d. 1780)
1714 – César-François Cassini de Thury, French astronomer and cartographer (d. 1784)
1718 – George Howard, English field marshal and politician, Governor of Minorca (d. 1796)
1778 – Gregory Blaxland, English-Australian explorer  (d. 1853)
1800 – William Parsons, 3rd Earl of Rosse, English-Irish astronomer and politician (d. 1867)
1808 – Henrik Wergeland, Norwegian poet, playwright, and linguist (d. 1845)
1810 – Ferdinand Freiligrath, German poet and translator (d. 1876)
1811 – Jón Sigurðsson, Icelandic scholar and politician (d. 1879)
1818 – Charles Gounod, French composer and academic (d. 1893)
  1818   – Sophie of Württemberg, queen of the Netherlands (d. 1877)
1821 – E. G. Squier, American archaeologist and journalist (d. 1888)
1832 – William Crookes, English chemist and physicist (d. 1919)
1833 – Manuel González Flores, Mexican general and president (d. 1893)
1858 – Eben Sumner Draper, American businessman and politician, 44th Governor of Massachusetts (d. 1914)
1861 – Pete Browning, American baseball player (d. 1905)
  1861   – Omar Bundy, American general (d. 1940)
1863 – Charles Michael, duke of Mecklenburg (d. 1934)
1865 – Susan La Flesche Picotte, Native American physician (d. 1915)
1867 – Flora Finch, English-American actress (d. 1940)
  1867   – John Robert Gregg, Irish-born American educator, publisher, and humanitarian (d. 1948)
  1867   – Henry Lawson, Australian poet and author (d. 1922)
1871 – James Weldon Johnson, American author, journalist, and activist (d. 1938)
1876 – William Carr, American rower (d. 1942)
  1876   – Edward Anthony Spitzka, American anatomist and author (d. 1922)
1880 – Carl Van Vechten, American author and photographer (d. 1964)
1881 – Tommy Burns, Canadian boxer and promoter (d. 1955)
1882 – Adolphus Frederick VI, Grand Duke of Mecklenburg-Strelitz (d. 1918)
  1882   – Igor Stravinsky, Russian pianist, composer, and conductor (d. 1971)
1888 – Heinz Guderian, German general (d. 1954)
1897 – Maria Izilda de Castro Ribeiro, Brazilian girl, popular saint (d. 1911)
1898 – M. C. Escher, Dutch illustrator (d. 1972)
  1898   – Carl Hermann, German physicist and academic (d. 1961)
  1898   – Joe McKelvey, Executed Irish republican (d. 1922)
  1898   – Harry Patch, English soldier and firefighter (d. 2009)
1900 – Martin Bormann, German politician (d. 1945)
  1900   – Evelyn Irons, Scottish journalist and war correspondent (d. 2000)

1901–present
1902 – Sammy Fain, American pianist and composer (d. 1989)
  1902   – Alec Hurwood, Australian cricketer (d. 1982)
1903 – Ruth Graves Wakefield, American chef, created the chocolate chip cookie (d. 1977)
1904 – Ralph Bellamy, American actor (d. 1991)
  1904   – J. Vernon McGee, American pastor and theologian (d. 1988)
  1904   – Patrice Tardif, Canadian farmer and politician (d. 1989)
1907 – Maurice Cloche, French director, producer, and screenwriter (d. 1990)
1909 – Elmer L. Andersen, American businessman and politician, 30th Governor of Minnesota (d. 2004)
  1909   – Ralph E. Winters, Canadian-American film editor (d. 2004)
1910 – Red Foley, American singer-songwriter and guitarist (d. 1968)
  1910   – George Hees, Canadian football player and politician (d. 1996)
1914 – John Hersey, American journalist and author (d. 1993)
1915 – David "Stringbean" Akeman, American singer and banjo player (d. 1973)
  1915   – Marcel Cadieux, Canadian civil servant and diplomat, Canadian Ambassador to the United States (d. 1981)
1916 – Terry Gilkyson, American singer-songwriter and guitarist (d. 1999)
1917 – Dufferin Roblin, Canadian politician, 14th Premier of Manitoba (d. 2010)
1918 – Ajahn Chah, Thai monk and educator (d. 1992)
1919 – William Kaye Estes, American psychologist and academic (d. 2011)
  1919   – John Moffat, Scottish lieutenant and pilot (d. 2016)
  1919   – Beryl Reid, English actress (d. 1996)
1920 – Jacob H. Gilbert, American lawyer and politician (d. 1981)
  1920   – Setsuko Hara, Japanese actress (d. 2015)
  1920   – François Jacob, French biologist and geneticist, Nobel Prize laureate (d. 2013)
  1920   – Peter Le Cheminant, English air marshal and politician, Lieutenant Governor of Guernsey (d. 2018)
1922 – John Amis, English journalist and critic (d. 2013)
1923 – Elroy Hirsch, American football player (d. 2004)
  1923   – Arnold S. Relman, American physician and academic (d. 2014)
  1923   – Dale C. Thomson, Canadian historian and academic (d. 1999)
1925 – Alexander Shulgin, American pharmacologist and chemist (d. 2014)
1927 – Martin Böttcher, German composer and conductor (d. 2019)
  1927   – Wally Wood, American author, illustrator, and publisher (d. 1981)
1928 – Juan María Bordaberry, President of Uruguay (d. 2011)
1929 – Bud Collins, American journalist and sportscaster (d. 2016)
  1929   – Tigran Petrosian, Armenian chess player (d. 1984)
1930 – Cliff Gallup, American rock & roll guitarist (d. 1988)
  1930   – Brian Statham, English cricketer (d. 2000)
1931 – John Baldessari, American painter and illustrator (d. 2020)
1932 – Derek Ibbotson, English runner (d. 2017)
  1932   – John Murtha, American colonel and politician (d. 2010)
1933 – Harry Browne, American soldier and politician (d. 2006)
  1933   – Christian Ferras, French violinist (d. 1982)
  1933   – Maurice Stokes, American basketball player (d. 1970)
1936 – Vern Harper, Canadian tribal leader and activist (d. 2018)
  1936   – Ken Loach, English director, producer, and screenwriter
1937 – Peter Fitzgerald, Irish footballer and manager (d. 2013)
  1937   – Ted Nelson, American sociologist and philosopher
  1937   – Clodovil Hernandes, Brazilian fashion designer, television presenter and politician (d. 2009)
1940 – George Akerlof, American economist and academic, Nobel Prize laureate
  1940   – Bobby Bell, American football player
  1940   – Chuck Rainey, American bassist 
1941 – Nicholas C. Handy, English chemist and academic (d. 2012)
1942 – Mohamed ElBaradei, Egyptian politician, Vice President of Egypt, Nobel Prize laureate
  1942   – Doğu Perinçek, Turkish lawyer and politician
  1942   – Roger Steffens, American actor and producer
1943 – Newt Gingrich, American historian and politician, 58th Speaker of the United States House of Representatives
  1943   – Barry Manilow, American singer-songwriter and producer
  1943   – Chantal Mouffe, Belgian theorist and author
  1943   – Burt Rutan, American engineer and pilot
1944 – Randy Johnson, American football player (d. 2009)
  1944   – Chris Spedding, English singer-songwriter and guitarist 
1945 – Tommy Franks, American general
  1945   – Ken Livingstone, English politician, 1st Mayor of London
  1945   – Eddy Merckx, Belgian cyclist and sportscaster
  1945   – Art Bell, American broadcaster and author (d. 2018)
1946 – Peter Rosei, Austrian author, poet, and playwright
1947 – Christopher Allport, American actor (d. 2008)
  1947   – Timothy Wright, American gospel singer, pastor (d. 2009)
  1947   – Linda Chavez, American journalist and author
  1947   – George S. Clinton, American composer and songwriter
  1947   – Gregg Rolie, American rock singer-songwriter and keyboard player
  1947   – Paul Young, English singer-songwriter (d. 2000)
1948 – Dave Concepción, Venezuelan baseball player and manager
  1948   – Jacqueline Jones, American historian and academic
  1948   – Aurelio López, Mexican baseball player and politician (d. 1992)
  1948   – Karol Sikora, English physician and academic
1949 – Snakefinger, English singer-songwriter and guitarist (d. 1987)
  1949   – John Craven, English economist and academic
  1949   – Russell Smith, American country singer-songwriter and guitarist (d. 2019)
1950 – Lee Tamahori, New Zealand film director
1951 – Starhawk, American author and activist
  1951   – John Garrett, Canadian ice hockey player and sportscaster
  1951   – Joe Piscopo, American actor, comedian, and screenwriter
1952 – Mike Milbury, American ice hockey player, coach, and manager
  1952   – Estelle Morris, Baroness Morris of Yardley, English educator and politician, Secretary of State for Education
1953 – Vernon Coaker, English educator and politician, Shadow Secretary of State for Defence
  1953   – Juan Muñoz, Spanish sculptor and storyteller (d. 2001)
1954 – Mark Linn-Baker, American actor and director
1955 – Mati Laur, Estonian historian, author, and academic
  1955   – Bob Sauvé, Canadian ice hockey player and coach
  1955   – Cem Hakko, Turkish fashion designer and businessman
1956 – Iain Milne, Scottish rugby player
1957 – Philip Chevron, Irish singer-songwriter and guitarist (d. 2013)
  1957   – Martin Dillon, American tenor and educator (d. 2005)
  1957   – Uģis Prauliņš, Latvian composer 
1958 – Pierre Berbizier, French rugby player and coach
  1958   – Jello Biafra, American singer-songwriter and producer 
  1958   – Bobby Farrelly, American director, producer, and screenwriter
  1958   – Sam Hamad, Syrian-Canadian academic and politician
  1958   – Jon Leibowitz, American lawyer and politician
  1958   – Daniel McVicar, American actor 
1959 – Carol Anderson, American author and historian
  1959   – Lawrence Haddad, South African-English economist and academic
  1959   – Nikos Stavropoulos, Greek basketball player and coach
1960 – Adrián Campos, Spanish race car driver (d. 2021)
  1960   – Thomas Haden Church, American actor 
1961 – Kōichi Yamadera, Japanese actor and singer
1962 – Michael Monroe, Finnish singer-songwriter and saxophonist
1963 – Greg Kinnear, American actor, television presenter, and producer
1964 – Rinaldo Capello, Italian race car driver
  1964   – Michael Gross, German swimmer
  1964   – Steve Rhodes, English cricketer and coach
1965 – Dermontti Dawson, American football player and coach
  1965   – Dana Eskelson, American actress.
  1965   – Dan Jansen, American speed skater and sportscaster
  1965   – Dara O'Kearney, Irish runner and poker player
1966 – Mohammed Ghazy Al-Akhras, Iraqi journalist and author
  1966   – Tory Burch, American fashion designer and philanthropist
  1966   – Ken Clark, American football player (d. 2013)
  1966   – Diane Modahl, English runner
  1966   – Jason Patric, American actor 
1967 – Dorothea Röschmann, German soprano and actress
  1967   – Eric Stefani, American keyboard player and composer 
1968 – Steve Georgallis, Australian rugby league player and coach
  1968   – Minoru Suzuki, Japanese wrestler and mixed martial artist
1969 – Paul Tergat, Kenyan runner
  1969   – Geoff Toovey, Australian rugby league player and coach
  1969   – Ilya Tsymbalar, Ukrainian-Russian footballer and manager (d. 2013)
1970 – Stéphane Fiset, Canadian ice hockey player
  1970   – Will Forte, American actor, comedian, and screenwriter
  1970   – Jason Hanson, American football player
  1970   – Popeye Jones, American basketball player and coach
  1970   – Michael Showalter, American actor, director, producer, and screenwriter
  1970   – Alan Dowson, English football manager and former professional player
1971 – Paulina Rubio, Mexican pop singer
  1971   – Mildred Fox, Irish politician
1973 – Leander Paes, Indian tennis player
1974 – Evangelia Psarra, Greek archer
1975 – Joshua Leonard, American actor, director, and screenwriter
  1975   – Juan Carlos Valerón, Spanish footballer
  1975   – Phiyada Akkraseranee, Thai actress and model 
1976 – Scott Adkins, English actor and martial artist
  1976   – Sven Nys, Belgian cyclist
1977 – Bartosz Brożek, Polish philosopher and jurist
  1977   – Tjaša Jezernik, Slovenian tennis player
  1977   – Mark Tauscher, American football player and sportscaster
1978 – Isabelle Delobel, French ice dancer
  1978   – Travis Roche, Canadian ice hockey player
1979 – Nick Rimando, American soccer player
  1979   – Tyson Apostol, American television personality
  1979   – Young Maylay, American rapper, producer, and voice actor
1980 – Elisa Rigaudo, Italian race walker
  1980   – Jeph Jacques, American author and illustrator
  1980   – Venus Williams, American tennis player
1981 – Kyle Boller, American football player
  1981   – Shane Watson, Australian cricketer
1982 – Alex Rodrigo Dias da Costa, Brazilian footballer
  1982   – Marek Svatoš, Slovak ice hockey player (d. 2016)
  1982   – Stanislava Hrozenská, Slovak tennis player
  1982   – Stefan Hodgetts, English racing driver
  1982   – Arthur Darvill, English actor
  1982   – Jodie Whittaker, English actress
1983 – Lee Ryan, English singer/actor
  1983   – Vlasis Kazakis, Greek footballer
1984 – Michael Mathieu, Bahamian sprinter
  1984   – Si Tianfeng, Chinese race walker
1985 – Özge Akın, Turkish sprinter
  1985   – Marcos Baghdatis, Cypriot tennis player
  1985   – Rafael Sóbis, Brazilian footballer
1986 – Apoula Edel, Armenian footballer
  1986   – Helen Glover, English rower
1987 – Kendrick Lamar, American rapper 
  1987   – Nozomi Tsuji, Japanese singer and actress 
1988 – Andrew Ogilvy, Australian basketball player
  1988   – Shaun MacDonald, Welsh footballer
  1988   – Stephanie Rice, Australian swimmer
1989 – Georgios Tofas, Cypriot footballer
  1989   – Simone Battle, American singer and actress (d. 2014)
1990 – Jordan Henderson, English footballer
  1990   – Josh Mansour, Australian rugby league player
1991 – Daniel Tupou, Australian-Tongan rugby league player
1994 – Amari Cooper, American football player
1995 – Clément Lenglet, French footballer
1997 – KJ Apa, New Zealand actor
1997 – Raluca Șerban, Romanian-Cypriot tennis player
1999 – Elena Rybakina, Kazakhstani tennis player

Deaths

Pre-1600
 656 – Uthman, caliph of the Rashidun Caliphate (b. 579)
 676 – Adeodatus, pope of the Catholic Church
 811 – Sakanoue no Tamuramaro, Japanese shōgun (b. 758)
 850 – Tachibana no Kachiko, Japanese empress (b. 786)
 900 – Fulk, French archbishop and chancellor
1025 – Bolesław I the Brave, Polish king (b. 967)
1091 – Dirk V, count of Holland (b. 1052)
1207 – Daoji, Chinese buddhist monk (b. 1130)
1219 – David of Scotland, 8th Earl of Huntingdon
1361 – Ingeborg of Norway, princess consort and regent of Sweden (b. 1301)
1400 – Jan of Jenštejn, archbishop of Prague (b. 1348)
1463 – Catherine of Portugal, Portuguese princess (b. 1436)
1501 – John I Albert, Polish king (b. 1459)
1565 – Ashikaga Yoshiteru, Japanese shōgun (b. 1536)

1601–1900
1631 – Mumtaz Mahal, Mughal princess (b. 1593)
1649 – Injo of Joseon, Korean king (b. 1595)
1674 – Jijabai, Dowager Queen, mother of Shivaji (b. 1598)
1694 – Philip Howard, English cardinal (b. 1629)
1696 – John III Sobieski, Polish king (b. 1629)
1719 – Joseph Addison, English essayist, poet, playwright, and politician  (b. 1672)
1734 – Claude Louis Hector de Villars, French general and politician, French Secretary of State for War (b. 1653)
1740 – Sir William Wyndham, 3rd Baronet, English politician, Chancellor of the Exchequer (b. 1687)
1762 – Prosper Jolyot de Crébillon, French poet and playwright (b. 1674)
1771 – Daskalogiannis, Greek rebel leader (b. 1722)
1775 – John Pitcairn, Scottish-English soldier (b. 1722)
1797 – Mohammad Khan Qajar, Persian tribal chief (b. 1742)
1813 – Charles Middleton, 1st Baron Barham, Scottish-English admiral and politician (b. 1726)
1821 – Martín Miguel de Güemes, Argentinian general and politician (b. 1785)
1839 – Lord William Bentinck, English general and politician, 14th Governor-General of India (b. 1774)
1866 – Joseph Méry, French poet and author (b. 1798)
1889 – Lozen, Chiracaua Apache warrior woman (b. ~1840)
1898 – Edward Burne-Jones, English soldier and painter (b. 1833)

1901–present
1904 – Nikolay Bobrikov, Russian soldier and politician, Governor-General of Finland (b. 1839)
1914 – Julien Félix, French military officer and aviator (b. 1869) 
1936 – Julius Seljamaa, Estonian journalist, politician, and diplomat, Estonian Minister of Foreign Affairs (b. 1883)
1939 – Allen Sothoron, American baseball player, coach, and manager (b. 1893)
  1939   – Eugen Weidmann, German criminal (b. 1908)
1940 – Arthur Harden, English biochemist and academic, Nobel Prize laureate (b. 1865)
1941 – Johan Wagenaar, Dutch organist and composer (b. 1862)
1942 – Charles Fitzpatrick, Canadian lawyer and politician, 5th Chief Justice of Canada (b. 1853)
1952 – Jack Parsons, American chemist and engineer (b. 1914)
1954 – Danny Cedrone, American guitarist and bandleader (b. 1920)
1956 – Percival Perry, 1st Baron Perry, English businessman (b. 1878)
  1956   – Paul Rostock, German surgeon and academic (b. 1892)
  1956   – Bob Sweikert, American race car driver (b. 1926)
1957 – Dorothy Richardson, English journalist and author (b. 1873)
  1957   – J. R. Williams, Canadian-American cartoonist (b. 1888)
1961 – Jeff Chandler, American actor (b. 1918)
1963 – Aleksander Kesküla, Estonian politician (b. 1882)
1968 – José Nasazzi, Uruguayan footballer and manager (b. 1901)
1974 – Refik Koraltan, Turkish lawyer and politician, 8th Speaker of the Grand National Assembly of Turkey (b. 1889)
1975 – James Phinney Baxter III, American historian and academic (b. 1893)
1979 – Hubert Ashton, English cricketer and politician (b. 1898)
  1979   – Duffy Lewis, American baseball player and manager (b. 1888)
1981 – Richard O'Connor, Indian-English general (b. 1889)
  1981   – Zerna Sharp, American author and educator (b. 1889)
1982 – Roberto Calvi, Italian banker (b. 1920)
1983 – Peter Mennin, American composer and educator (b. 1923)
1985 – John Boulting, English director, producer, and screenwriter (b. 1913)
1986 – Kate Smith, American singer (b. 1907)
1987 – Dick Howser, American baseball player, coach, and manager (b. 1936)
1996 – Thomas Kuhn, American historian and philosopher (b. 1922)
  1996   – Curt Swan, American illustrator (b. 1920)
1999 – Basil Hume, English cardinal (b. 1923)
2000 – Ismail Mahomed, South African lawyer and jurist, 17th Chief Justice of South Africa (b. 1931)
2001 – Donald J. Cram, American chemist and academic, Nobel Prize laureate (b. 1919)
  2001   – Thomas Winning, Scottish cardinal (b. 1925)
2002 – Willie Davenport, American sprinter and hurdler (b. 1943)
  2002   – Fritz Walter, German footballer (b. 1920)
2004 – Gerry McNeil, Canadian ice hockey player (b. 1926)
2006 – Bussunda, Brazilian comedian (b. 1962)
2007 – Gianfranco Ferré, Italian fashion designer (b. 1944)
  2007   – Serena Wilson, American dancer and choreographer (b. 1933)
2008 – Cyd Charisse, American actress and dancer (b. 1922)
2009 – Ralf Dahrendorf, German-English sociologist and politician (b. 1929)
  2009   – Darrell Powers, American sergeant (b. 1923)
2011 – Rex Mossop, Australian rugby player and sportscaster (b. 1928)
2012 – Stéphane Brosse, French mountaineer (b. 1971)
  2012   – Patricia Brown, American baseball player (b. 1931)
  2012   – Nathan Divinsky, Canadian mathematician and chess player (b. 1925)
  2012   – Rodney King, American victim of police brutality (b. 1965)
  2012   – Fauzia Wahab, Pakistani actress and politician (b. 1956)
2013 – Michael Baigent, New Zealand-English theorist and author (b. 1948)
  2013   – Atiqul Haque Chowdhury, Bangladeshi playwright and producer (b. 1930)
  2013   – Pierre F. Côté, Canadian lawyer and civil servant (b. 1927)
  2013   – Bulbs Ehlers, American basketball player (b. 1923)
  2013   – James Holshouser, American politician, 68th Governor of North Carolina (b. 1934)
2014 – Patsy Byrne, English actress (b. 1933)
  2014   – Éric Dewailly, Canadian epidemiologist and academic (b. 1954)
  2014   – Stanley Marsh 3, American businessman and philanthropist (b. 1938) 
  2014   – Arnold S. Relman, American physician and academic (b. 1923)
  2014   – Larry Zeidel, Canadian-American ice hockey player and sportscaster (b. 1928)
2015 – Ron Clarke, Australian runner and politician, Mayor of the Gold Coast (b. 1937)
  2015   – John David Crow, American football player and coach (b. 1935)
  2015   – Süleyman Demirel, Turkish engineer and politician, 9th President of Turkey (b. 1924)
  2015   – Roberto M. Levingston, Argentinian general and politician, 36th President of Argentina (b. 1920)
  2015   – Clementa C. Pinckney, American minister and politician (b. 1973) 
2017 – Baldwin Lonsdale, president of Vanuatu (b. 1948)
2019 – Gloria Vanderbilt, American artist, author actress, fashion designer, heiress and socialite (b. 1924)
  2019   – Mohamed Morsi, Egyptian professor and politician, first elected president of Egypt after Egyptian revolution (b. 1951)
2021 – Kenneth Kaunda, Zambian educator and politician, first president of Zambia (b. 1924)

Holidays and observances
Christian feast day:
Albert Chmielowski
Botolph (England and Scandinavia)
Gondulphus of Berry
Hervé
Hypatius of Bithynia (Eastern Orthodox and Byzantine Catholic Churches)
Rainerius
Samuel and Henrietta Barnett (Church of England)
June 17 (Eastern Orthodox liturgics)
Father's Day (El Salvador, Guatemala)
Icelandic National Day, celebrates the independence of Iceland from Kingdom of Denmark in 1944.
National Day of Remembrance for the Victims of Forest Fires (Portugal)
Occupation of the Latvian Republic Day (Latvia)
World Day to Combat Desertification and Drought (international)
Zemla Intifada Day (Sahrawi Arab Democratic Republic)

References

External links

 
 
 

Days of the year
June